The 2002 Fiji rugby union tour of Europe was a series of matches played in November 2002 in Wales Ireland and Scotland by Fiji national rugby union team.

Results

Wales 

Wales: 15.Rhys Williams, 14.Mark Jones, 13.Tom Shanklin, 12.Sonny Parker, 11.Gareth Thomas, 10.Stephen Jones, 9.Dwayne Peel, 8.Colin Charvis (capt.), 7.Martyn Williams, 6.Dafydd Jones, 5.Gareth Llewellyn, 4.Robert Sidoli, 3.Ben Evans, 2.Mefin Davies, 1.Iestyn Thomas,  – replacements: 17.Martyn Madden, 18.Steve Williams, 19.Richard Parks, 21.Iestyn Harris, 22.Jamie Robinson     –  No entry : 16.Andrew Lewis, 20.Ryan Powell
Fiji: 15.Joseph Narruhn, 14.Fero Lasagavibau, 13.Seru Rabeni, 12.Seremaia Baikeinuku , 11.Norman Ligairi, 10.Nicky Little, 9.Jacob Rauluni, 8.Alfie Mocelutu, 7.Alifereti Doviverata, 6.Seta Tawake, 5.Simon Raiwalui, 4.Apenisa Naevo, 3.Bill Cavubati, 2.Greg Smith (capt.), 1.Richard Nyholt,  – replacements: 19.Sisa Koyamaibole, 20.Samisoni Rabaka, 21.Epeli Ruivadra, 22.Waisale Serevi      –  No entry: 16.Bill Gadolo, 17.Paula Biutanaseva, 18.Isaia Rasila

Ireland 

Ireland: 15.Geordan Murphy, 14.Shane Horgan, 13.Brian O'Driscoll (capt.), 12.Kevin Maggs, 11.Justin Bishop, 10.David Humphreys, 9.Guy Easterby, 8.Anthony Foley, 7.Kieron Dawson, 6.Alan Quinlan, 5.Malcolm O'Kelly, 4.Leo Cullen, 3.John Hayes, 2.Frank Sheahan, 1.Marcus Horan,  – replacements: 17.Reggie Corrigan, 18.Mick O'Driscoll, 19.Eric Miller, 22.Gordon D'Arcy      –  No entry : 16.Shane Byrne, 20.Peter Stringer, 21.Ronan O'Gara
Fiji: 15.Waisale Serevi, 14.Fero Lasagavibau, 13.Viliame Satala, 12.Seremaia Baikeinuku, 11.Norman Ligairi, 10.Nicky Little, 9.Jacob Rauluni, 8.Sisa Koyamaibole, 7.Alifereti Doviverata, 6.Alfie Mocelutu, 5.Simon Raiwalui, 4.Apenisa Naevo, 3.Bill Cavubati, 2.Greg Smith (capt.), 1.Richard Nyholt,  – replacements: 18.Ifereimi Rawaqa, 19.Seta Tawake Naivaluwaqa, 20.Samisoni Rabaka, 21.Joseph Narruhn      –  No entry: 16.Paula Biutanaseva, 17.Isaia Rasila, 22.Isaac Mow

Scotland "A"

Scotland 

Scotland: Ben Hinshelwood, 14.Nikki Walker, 13.Andy Craig, 12.Brendan Laney, 11.Chris Paterson, 10.Gregor Townsend, 9.Bryan Redpath(capt), 8.Tom Smith, 7.Gordon Bulloch, 6.Bruce Douglas, 5.Jason White, 4.Simon Taylor, 3.Stuart Grimes, 2.Budge Pountney, 1.Jon Petrie,  – replacements: 16.Steve Scott, 18.Nathan Hines, 19.Martin Leslie , 20.Graeme Beveridge, 21.Gordon Ross, 22.Stuart Moffat    –  No entry : 17.Dave Hilton
Fiji: 15.Atonio Nariva, 14.Fero Lasagavibau, 13.Epeli Ruivadra, 12.Seremaia Baikeinuku, 11.Norman Ligairi, 10.Joseph Narruhn, 9.Jacob Rauluni, 8.Seta Tawake Naivaluwaqa, 7.Alfie Mocelutu, 6.Sisa Koyamaibole , 5.Simon Raiwalui, 4.Apenisa Naevo, 3.Bill Cavubati, 2.Greg Smith , 1.Isaia Rasila,  – replacements: 17.Bill Gadolo, 18.Kele Leawere, 19.Emori Katalau, 20.Waisale Serevi, 21.Viliame Satala   No entry: 16.Paula Biutanaseva, 22.Isaac Mow

References

Note

Fiji
tour
Fiji rugby union tour
Fiji national rugby union team tours
tour
tour
tour
Rugby union tours of Ireland
Rugby union tours of Scotland
Rugby union tours of Wales